Oloneo PhotoEngine is a popular digital image editing software application developed by Paris-based Oloneo SAS. The application produces high-dynamic-range images and tone mapped images by programatically combining standard-dynamic range images of different exposures. PhotoEngine supports 96-bit per pixel HDR image files in RAW and TIFF formats.

The software, developed by Oloneo's president Antoine Clappier, was first beta released in July 2010.

References

External links
 

HDR tone mapping software